The Taylor Review with the full title Good Work: The Taylor Review of Modern Working Practices (July 2017) was a review submitted to the UK government concerning employee and worker rights in UK labour law. It was chaired by Matthew Taylor, Chief Executive of the Royal Society of the Arts. Its aim was "to consider how employment practices need to change in order to keep pace with modern business models" and the report made a series of recommendations for reform. The final report was published on 11 July 2017 as a 116-page PDF document, alongside many invited submissions, released in full.

Contents

Table of contents for Good Work: The Taylor Review of Modern Working Practices.

Chapter  1 Foreword
Chapter  2 Our approach
Chapter  3 Quality of work 
Chapter  4 Evolution of the labour market 
Chapter  5 Clarity in the law 
Chapter  6 One-sided flexibility 
Chapter  7 Responsible business 
Chapter  8 Fairer enforcement 
Chapter  9 Incentives in the system 
Chapter 10 A new offer to the self-employed 
Chapter 11 Scope for development 
Chapter 12 Opportunity to progress 
Chapter 13 Embedding lasting change 
Chapter 14 Seven Point Plan 
Chapter 15 References 

Considerable attention is given to the regulatory and taxation status of the component of the workforce who are either legitimately self-employed or who claim self-employment against the grain of existing labour law, for a variety of reasons.

The report advocates the retention of worker status, but in order to reduce confusion among those who claim this, recommends renaming this status to "Dependent Contractor".

Notes

References
Institute of Employment Rights, 'Our Guide to the Taylor Review' (13 July 2017)
E McGaughey, 'Uber Fraud, Mutuality and the Taylor Review' (2017) Industrial Law Journal 
E McGaughey, 'Taylorooism: when network technology meets corporate power' (2018) 49(5-6) Industrial Relations Journal 459

United Kingdom labour law